Jean-Baptiste Noulet (1 May 1802 – 24 May 1890) was a French scientist and naturalist who helped to prove the archæological existence of humans and was one of the pioneers of the scientific discipline of prehistoric archaeology. He was born in Venerque.

Having obtained his doctorate in medicine at Montpellier in 1832, Noulet focused his research on Occitania and latterly on the Occitan language. In 1841, he was appointed chair of medical natural history at the preparatory school of medicine and pharmacy in Toulouse. Noulet served as the director of the Natural History Museum in Toulouse from 1872, where he founded a gallery devoted to prehistory.

In the field of malacology, he issued an analytical study on the natural history of fluvial and terrestrial mollusks native to the sub-Pyrenean basin (1834). As a botanist, he published an exhaustive volume (754 pages) on regional plants of the sub-Pyrenees, La Flore du Bassin sous-pyrénéen (1837).

In 1851, at Clermont-le-Fort, he discovered the remains of Pleistocene fauna, along with the presence of lithic artifacts, findings that seemingly proved the co-existence of Pleistocene animals with humans, and in essence, confirmed ideas that were earlier proposed by prehistorian Jacques Boucher de Perthes (1788-1868).

References

External links 

 Google Books search result for Noulet's writings

Prehistorians
1802 births
1890 deaths
19th-century French botanists
French malacologists
People from Haute-Garonne